Charles Morales (4 April 1895 – 18 March 1987) was a Jamaican cricketer. He played in twelve first-class matches for the Jamaican cricket team from 1924 to 1929.

See also
 List of Jamaican representative cricketers

References

External links
 

1895 births
1987 deaths
Jamaican cricketers
Jamaica cricketers
People from Hanover Parish